Olina may refer to:

People
 Giovanni Pietro Olina (1585–1645), Italian naturalist, lawyer, and theologian
 Olina Storsand Storsand (born 1922), Norwegian politician
 Ruth Olina Lødemel Lødemel (born 1966), Norwegian soprano, dancer, actor and composer
 Steinunn Ólína Þorsteinsdóttir (born 1969), Icelandic actress, TV show host, producer and writer
 Ólína Guðbjörg Viðarsdóttir (born 1982), Icelandic football player
 Ólína Þorvarðardóttir (born 1958), Icelandic politician

Places
 Olina, Italy

Other
 Olina, genus also known as Vila (butterfly)